Elmont is an unincorporated community in Franklin County, in the U.S. state of Missouri.

History
A post office called Elmont was established in 1887, and remained in operation until 1938. The name Elmont is a transfer from another American town of the same name, as a town founder selected the name randomly from a postal directory.

References

Unincorporated communities in Franklin County, Missouri
Unincorporated communities in Missouri